A line laser is a device that employs a laser and an optical lens to project the laser beam as a line rather than a point (e.g. laser pointer). This may be achieved by passing the beam through a cylindrical lens or a Powell lens.

Depending on the application, independent line lasers may be used to generate lines, or multiple line lasers may be used together to produce crosses or other composite patterns. In civil engineering and interior design, line lasers are used to assist in levelling building sites and structures. Multiple lines may be generated for use with image processing.

Applications

 Diffractive beam splitter
 Calibration
 Spirit level
 David Laserscanner
 Light section
 Image processing
 Machine vision
 3D scanner
 Laser scanning
 Laser line level
 Laser level
 Surveying
 Detecting tripwires

External links

References

Construction surveying
Laser applications
Laser image generation